Ken and Neal Skupski were the defending champions but chose not to defend their title.

Roman Jebavý and Igor Zelenay won the title after defeating Dino Marcan and Tristan-Samuel Weissborn 7–6(7–4), 6–7(4–7), [10–6] in the final.

Seeds

Draw

References
 Main Draw

Challenger La Manche - Doubles